Clark is a community located approximately 30 miles (50 km) north of Cody on Wyoming Highway 120, in Park County, Wyoming, United States. Clark is unincorporated, and has no specific central "town site" per se, or town services. It is included in the Powell Zip Code area, which is approximately 30 miles (50 km) away, but has no other formal connection to Powell except the school district.

Residents are a mix of farmers (irrigation water from local creeks and rivers), ranchers, and retirees who come to the area for the peaceful and relaxed atmosphere. Otherwise those working generally have employment in Powell or Cody. There is an elementary school in Clark, which is part of Park County School District #1 in Powell, but most junior high and high school students bus to Powell and the rest to Belfry, Montana.

Clark borders the Shoshone National Forest, state, and BLM-administered lands and Clark's Fork River/Canyon, making it a prime area for the outdoor enthusiast. The area is semi-arid high desert sagebrush plains with little rain or snowfall, averaging less than 10" per year, as the bordering mountains squeeze much of the moisture from the atmosphere. It was a wintering area for Indian tribes in the 19th century, due to the milder temperatures, relative lack of snow, abundant sunshine and game animals. Tipi rings can be found in the area.

History
John Colter, a member of the Lewis and Clark Expedition, and later well known mountain man, broke off from the expedition on the return trip in 1806, explored the Yellowstone area, and spent a winter near the future Clark. Chief Joseph of the Nez Perce, running from the US Army in 1877, came through the area, and out the mouth of Clark's Fork Canyon on his way to Canada. There was a battle between General Nelson A. Miles and some Bannock Indians along Little Rock Creek. The creek was named for one of the scouts involved in that battle. For a thorough narrative and analysis of the battle, see Walpole, Kyle  BENNETT BUTTE: "BIVOUAC OF THE DEAD"  A Narrative of Miles' Fight on the Clark's Fork and Analysis of a Monumental Historical Mystery.  Orig 1998.  Digital iBooks publication 2013.  Bennett Creek is named for a Captain Bennett who was killed in the engagement. Part of the saga of Earl Durrand, outlaw and backwoodsman, was played out in Clark.

Clark plus the Clark's Fork of the Yellowstone River were named for William Clark, of the Lewis and Clark Expedition.

Wildlife
The area is home to pronghorn antelope, mule and whitetail deer, elk, black and grizzly bear, Rocky Mountain Goats, and bighorn sheep. Some moose also live in and along the nearby mountains, as well as coyotes, wolves and mountain lions.

Climate

According to the Köppen Climate Classification system, Clark has a warm-summer humid continental climate, abbreviated "Dfb" on climate maps.

References

External links
 Clark Resource Council
 Map of Clark, WY

Unincorporated communities in Park County, Wyoming
Unincorporated communities in Wyoming